This is a list of Buddhist temples, monasteries, stupas, and pagodas in Australia for which there are Wikipedia articles, sorted by location.

New South Wales

 Nan Tien Temple
 Sunnataram Forest Monastery

Queensland

 Chung Tian Temple

South Australia

 Pháp Hoa Temple

Victoria
 Tara Institute
 Thubten Shedrup Ling

Western Australia
 Bodhinyana Monastery

See also
Buddhism in Australia
Ajahn Brahmavamso
Ajahn Sujato
Ayya Nirodha
Geshe Acharya Thubten Loden
Geshe Sonam Thargye
Great Stupa of Universal Compassion
List of Buddhist temples

Notes

External links

 BuddhaNet's Comprehensive Directory of Buddhist Temples sorted by country
 Buddhactivity Dharma Centres database

Australia
Australia
Buddhist temples